Paintin' the Town Brown is the first live album by American rock band Ween, released by Elektra Records on June 22, 1999.

Paintin' the Town Brown serves as a live retrospective for the group, a 2-CD set containing songs from Ween's very first live shows (which were simply Dean, Gene, and a DAT deck) to Ween's tour in support of The Mollusk (though no songs from that particular album are featured).

This album was initially meant to be the first release on Ween's own record label Chocodog, but Elektra took the project away from the group and released it themselves. This would serve as part of the basis for Ween's departure from Elektra.

Track listing
All tracks written by Ween.

Disc one

Disc two

Personnel
 Dean Ween - guitar, vocals, liner notes
 Gene Ween - guitar, vocals
 Danny Parks - guitar
 Dave Dreiwitz - bass
 Matt Kohut - bass
 Andrew Weiss - bass
 Stuart Basore - pedal steel
 Hank Singer - fiddle, percussion
 Bobby Ogdin - percussion, piano, keyboard
 Pidah Kloos - mixing
 Kirk Miller - producer, compilation, mixing
 Greg Frey - producer, compilation, editing
 Ween - producer, compilation
 Gregory Burke - design

Charts

Album
1999   Paintin' The Town Brown: Ween Live 1990-1998   Heatseekers  No. 37

References

1999 live albums
Ween live albums
Elektra Records live albums